Mariager is a town in Denmark with a population of 2,506 (1 January 2022). It is situated on the southern shores of the inlet of Mariager Fjord in Mariagerfjord municipality, North Denmark Region in Jutland. This part of Jutland is also known as Kronjylland (Crown Jutland).

Notable people 
 Mariane Bournonville (1768 in Mariager – 1797) a ballerina, active at the Royal Danish Ballet in 1784-1796
 Vilhelm Dahlerup (1836 in Mariager – 1907) architect who specialized in the Historicist style
 Budtz Müller (1837 in Mariager – 1884) a pioneering Danish photographer
 Philip Smidth (1855 in Mariager – 1938) a prolific architect in the Historicist style
 Peter Nansen (1861–1918 in Mariager) novelist, journalist, and publisher
 Aksel Nielsen (1901 in Mariager – 1984) a Danish-American philanthropist, emigrated 1910
 Erik Bach (born 1946 in Mariager), classical composer and former principal of Royal Academy of Music in Aarhus
 Emmelie de Forest (born 1993), singer and songwriter, brought up in Mariager

Sport 
 Thomas Andie (born 1972 in Mariager), former professional footballer, over 200 club caps
 Kim Christensen (born 1984 in Mariager) athlete, competed in the shot put at the 2012 Summer Olympics

References

External links

Mariager Trade Association
Mariagerfjord municipality

 
Cities and towns in the North Jutland Region
Mariagerfjord Municipality